Acontias is a genus of limbless skinks, the lance skinks, (family Scincidae) in the African subfamily Acontinae. Most are small animals, but the largest member of the genus is Acontias plumbeus at approximately  snout-vent length.  All members of this genus are live-bearing sandswimmers, with fused eyelids. A recent review  moved species that were formerly placed in the genera Typhlosaurus, Acontophiops, and Microacontias into this genus, as together these form a single branch in the tree of life. This new concept of Acontias is a sister lineage to Typhlosaurus, and these two genera are the only genera within the subfamily Acontinae.

Species
These 26 species are recognized:
 Acontias albigularis Conradie, Busschau, & Edwards, 2018 – white-throated legless skink
 Acontias aurantiacus (W. Peters, 1854) – golden blind legless skink
 Acontias bicolor (Hewitt, 1929)
 Acontias breviceps Essex, 1925 – shorthead lance skink
 Acontias cregoi (Boulenger, 1903) – Cregoe's legless skink
 Acontias fitzsimonsi (Broadley, 1968) – Fitzsimons's legless skink 
 Acontias gariepensis (V. FitzSimons, 1941) – Mier Kalahari legless skink
 Acontias gracilicauda Essex, 1925 – thin-tailed legless skink, slendertail lance skink 
 Acontias grayi Boulenger, 1887 – Gray's dwarf legless skink 
 Acontias jappi (Broadley, 1968) – Japp’s burrowing skink 
 Acontias kgalagadi (Lamb, Biswas & Bauer, 2010) – Kalahari burrowing skink, Kgalagadi legless skink
 Acontias lineatus W. Peters, 1879 – striped dwarf legless skink, lined lance skink
 Acontias litoralis Broadley & Greer, 1969 – coastal dwarf legless skink
 Acontias meleagris (Linnaeus, 1758) – Cape legless skink, golden sand skink; spotted slow skink; thick-tailed blindworm, erdslang, Linnaeus's lance skink
 Acontias namaquensis Hewitt, 1938 – Namaqua legless skink, Namaqua lance skink 
Acontias occidentalis V. FitzSimons, 1941 – western burrowing skink, savanna legless skink 
 Acontias orientalis Hewitt, 1938 – eastern striped blindworm, Eastern Cape legless skink 
 Acontias parietalis (Broadley, 1990) – Maputaland legless skink  
 Acontias percivali Loveridge, 1935 – Percival's lance skink, Teita limbless skink
 Acontias plumbeus Bianconi, 1849 – giant legless skink, giant lance skink
 Acontias richardi (Jacobsen, 1987) – Richard’s legless skink
 Acontias rieppeli (Lamb, Biswas & Bauer, 2010) – Woodbush legless skink
Acontias schmitzi Wagner, Broadley & Bauer, 2012
Acontias subtaeniatus (Broadley, 1968) – stripe-bellied legless skink
 Acontias tristis F. Werner, 1910 – Namaqualand dwarf legless skink
 Acontias wakkerstroomensis Conradie, Busschau, & Edwards, 2018 – Wakkerstroom legless skink
Nota bene: A binomial authority in parentheses indicates the species was originally described in a genus other than Acontias.

Gallery

References

Further reading
Boulenger GA (1887). Catalogue of the Lizards in the British Museum (Natural History). Second Edition. Volume III. ... Scincidæ ... London: Trustees of the British Museum (Natural History). (Taylor and Francis, printers). xii + 575 pp. + Plates I-XL. (Genus Acontias, p. 424).
Branch, Bill (2004). Field Guide to Snakes and other Reptiles of Southern Africa. Third Revised Edition, Second impression. Sanibel Island, Florida: Ralph Curtis Books. 399 pp. . (Genus Acontias, p. 132).
Cuvier G (1817). Le règne animale distribué d'après son organisation, pour servir de base a l'histoire naturelle des animaux et d'introduction a l'anatomie comparée. Tome II, contenant les reptiles, les poissons, les mollusques et les annélides. Paris: Déterville. xviii + 532 pp. (Acontias, new subgenus, p. 60). (in French).

 
Lizard genera
Taxa named by Georges Cuvier